Dragomir "Drago" Čumić (Serbian Cyrillic: Драгомир "Драго" Чумић; 8 May 1937 in Sirač near Daruvar, Kingdom of Yugoslavia – 10 November 2013 in Belgrade, Serbia) was a Serbian actor. His credits includes roles in the TV series The Collector and Bolji život.

References

External links

1937 births
2013 deaths
People from Daruvar
Serbs of Croatia
Serbian male actors